Potapov (masculine) or Potapova (feminine) is a Russian surname. Notable people with the surname include:

 Aleksandr Potapov (1818–1886), Russian statesman
 Anastasia Potapova, (born 2001), Russian tennis player
 Leonid Potapov (1935-2020), Russian politician
 Leonid P. Potapov (1905–2000), Russian ethnographer
 Maksim Potapov (ice hockey), Russian ice hockey player
 Mikhail Feofanovich Potapov (1921–1943), Soviet military officer
 Viktor Potapov (1947–2017), Russian sailor
 Viktor Pavlovich Potapov (1934–2021), Soviet and Russian naval aviator
 Vladimir Potapov (1914–1980), Ukrainian mathematician

See also
 13480 Potapov, a main-belt asteroid

Russian-language surnames